Xu Jiao (born 5 August 1997) is a Chinese actress. She made her film debut in the 2008 sci-fi film CJ7 where she played a boy, and won the Hong Kong Film Award for Best New Performer. She is also known for the films Starry Starry Night (2011) and Mr. Go (2013).

Filmography

Film

Television series

References

External links 
 

1997 births
Living people
Actresses from Zhejiang
Chinese child actresses
Actors from Ningbo
Chinese film actresses
21st-century Chinese actresses
Chinese television actresses